Beta Mensae, Latinized from β Mensae, is the third-brightest star in the constellation of Mensa. Despite this, it is only faintly visible to the naked eye, appearing as a dim, yellow-hued point of light with an apparent visual magnitude of 5.31. The star is positioned near the southwest edge of the Large Magellanic Cloud, but it does not form part of this much more distant satellite galaxy. Based upon an annual parallax shift of just 4.11 mas as seen from the Earth, the star is located at a distance of roughly 790 light years from the Sun. It is moving closer with a heliocentric radial velocity of −11 km/s.

This is a solitary, G-type giant star with a stellar classification of G8 III. It is around 270 million years old with 3.6 times the mass of the Sun. Having exhausted the supply of hydrogen at its core, it has expanded to 26 times the Sun's radius. Beta Mensae is radiating 513 times the Sun's luminosity from its photosphere at an effective temperature of about 5,088 K.

References

G-type giants
Mensa (constellation)
Mensae, Beta
PD-71 00309
033285
023467
1677